Victory is a 2013 Indian Kannada comedy film directed by Nanda Kishore and written by M. S. Sreenath. The film stars Sharan and Asmita Sood in the lead roles along with Avinash, Ravishankar and Ramesh Bhat playing supporting roles. Actress Ragini Dwivedi appears in one item dance number for the film. The film is produced by SRS Media Vision in association with Anand Audio, a popular audio company in Karnataka.

The film was an instant success at the box-office. The original score and soundtrack for the film was composed by Arjun Janya. One of the songs, "Khali Quarter", from the film went viral on the social media and was widely appreciated by celebrities and critics. The film premiered in the US through producer Atlanta Nagendra on 6 September 2013, and was widely appreciated. It was observed that the storyline of the movie was similar to that of 1995 Kannada movie Ganeshana Galate which itself was based on the 1978 movie The Odd Job. The movie was remade in Telugu in 2016 as Selfie Raja starring Allari Naresh. The movie had a sequel titled Victory 2 released in 2018 in which he played a quadruplet thereby becoming the second Indian actor after Kamal Hassan to play such a role.

Plot
The film starts with Chandru (Sharan) marrying Priya (Asmita Sood) and on the very first night of their marriage they get separated. Dejected by this, Chandru attempts suicide several times, but in vain. He then hires a local Don (Ravishankar) and gives him a week's time to kill him. Meanwhile, Priya returns to Chandru realizing her mistakes and wants to live with him. But the don is reluctant to kill Chandru as per the contract and would not spare him. What follows is the comical twists and turns about how Chandru escapes from the don and re-unites with Priya.

Cast

 Sharan as Chandru/Munna 
 Asmita Sood as Priya
 Ravishankar as Ravi
 Tabla Nani as Chinthamani choornananda, Chandru's uncle 
 Avinash as DCP Rajendra 
 Sadhu Kokila as Inspector Saadhu Gowda 
 Ramesh Bhat
 Mimicry Dayanand
 Rani Damukumar 
 Girija Lokesh
 Apoorva
 Rachana Gowda 
 Akki channabasappa 
 Chikkanna
 Arasu Maharaj 
 Mithra
 Keerthiraj as veerabhadra 
 Rockline Sudhakar 
 Mandeep Rai 
 Sangamesh upase 
 Cool Chinna 
 Kuri Pratap
 Ragini Dwivedi as Maya (item number)
 Nanda Kishore in a cameo appearance in song "Khali Quarter"

Production
Actor turned debutant director Nanda Kishore, son of yester-year actor Sudheer, announced his maiden project and titled it as "Victory". He roped in Sharan as the main protagonist who tasted big success from Rambo released in 2012. One of the unit members reported that the film would be a comic-caper and would engage the audience for its complete length. Model-turned-actress Asmita Sood who was a Miss India finalist in 2011, was signed up for her first Kannada film to play the lead role opposite Sharan.

Soundtrack

Owing to the success of the previous venture, Rambo, the audio company Anand Audio, which also returned to film production, once again teamed up with music director Arjun Janya and actor Sharan for this film. Arjun composed four tracks for the film out of which one repeats in male and female versions. Well known lyricists such as Jayanth Kaikini, Yogaraj Bhat, K. Kalyan and Kaviraj wrote the lyrics for the songs. Popular yester-year playback singer L. R. Eswari made a comeback by rendering her voice for a dance song in this film.

The single "Khali Quarter" from the soundtrack sung by Vijay Prakash and written by Yogaraj Bhat went viral on the online video sharing sites and was widely considered as one of the most successful songs of 2013.

Response
Victory opened to a tremendous response at the box office. All across the Karnataka State, the film was declared a blockbuster hit within the first week of its release. Even before the release, the film created a news by selling the satellite rights at a record price of  2.5Crores to a Kannada channel. This price itself was the total production cost of the film and further the distribution sales were at the record selling price which made the film a blockbuster all over. The first week collections mounted about 6Crores while the first weekend collections were about 2.6Crores.

Reception

Critical response 

A critic from The Times of India scored the film at 3 out of 5 stars and says "Sharan has again proved that he is a hero material with his brilliant performance. Asmitha Sood has done a good job. Ravishankar is as excellent in comedy roles as in villain’s roles. Ragini’s dance sequence and Arjun Janya’s music are the highlights. Shekhar Chandra as captured some eye-catching scenes in his camera". B S Srivani from Deccan Herald wrote "Victory, however, leaves two questions unanswered: One, was the Akka nin maglu song really necessary? Second, who played Chandru’s aunt — Sharan himself or...?". A critic from Sify.com wrote "Music by Arjun Janya may not be top class, but one song Khaali Quarter (lyrics penned by Yograj Bhat) has become a chartbuster. Ragini Dwivedi has performed an item number in the movie and it fails to live up to the expectations. This movie is definitely for those who want a change in their routine life by laughing for a couple of hours".

References

External links
 

2013 films
2010s Kannada-language films
Indian comedy films
2013 comedy films
2013 directorial debut films
Films scored by Arjun Janya
Kannada films remade in other languages
Films directed by Nanda Kishore